The siege of Toledo was Alfonso VI of León and Castile's siege and conquest of Toledo, capital of the Taifa of Toledo, from Yahya al-Qadir of the Dhulnunid dynasty in Muharram 478 / May 1085. The Castilian conquest of the former Visigothic capital was achieved through a strategy of attrition warfare developed by Castile in the preceding years. As it represented a shift in power on the Iberian peninsula, the siege of Toledo was the most significant event in the taifa period.

Context 
In 1075, through an alliance with the Taifa of Seville, Alfonso VI defeated the Taifa of Granada. Later in the same year, Alfonso VI supported Toledo against the Taifa of Córdoba. When the king of Toledo, Yahya al-Mamun, was assassinated in Córdoba, Yahya al-Qadir assumed power in Toledo. He expelled Alfonso's supporters, fomenting division among his subjects.

Siege 
Alfonso VI first set up camp south of Toledo in the autumn of 1084. This was a permanent camp, the purpose of which was to harass the city continually until Alfonso returned with a substantial army the following year. Alfonso himself was back in León by December.

Alfonso brought his main forces in mid-March 1085. After a siege of about two months, Yahya al-Qadir—who was unable to gain support from neighboring taifas, pay off Alfonso VI, or defend the city himself—surrendered. The terms, accepted May 6, 1085, included guarantees for Muslims' lives, property, liberty, and religious expression. Agreements with the Jewish population of Toledo were made separately. Alfonso formally entered the city on May 25, and by August his forces had conquered the surrounding territories in the Tagus Basin—including Madrid—adding them to the Kingdom of Castile.

Legacy 
The fall of Toledo caused the rulers of the taifas of Seville, Badajoz, and Granada to send a joint delegation to Yusuf ibn Tashfin of the Almoravid dynasty seeking assistance against the Castile.

References 

Toledo
Sieges involving Castile
Taifa of Toledo
Tagus basin
Sieges involving Al-Andalus